André Ribeiro da Cunha Pereira (January 18, 1966 – May 22, 2021) was a Brazilian racing driver who raced in CART from 1995 through 1998, where he claimed three wins.

Career 
Ribeiro started his career in karting and he finished second in the Paulista Kart Championship, Brazil's national karting championship, for three consecutive years between 1986 and 1988. In 1989 he moved to compete in Formula Ford finishing third in his debut season in Brazil's national Formula Three Championship. In 1990 he moved to Formula Opel where he competed for Team Lotus Nederland. In 1991 he moved to British Formula 3 where he drove first for Paul Stewart Racing and then Fortec Motorsport. In 1994 he drove in Indy Lights for Tasman Motorsports finishing second in his debut 1994 season where he won four races.

Ribeiro remained with Tasman Motorsports when he moved to CART in 1995 and would remain with them until 1997. He finished 18th at the 1995 Indianapolis 500, and got a win at New hampshire. In 1996 he won two oval races at his homeland Jacarepaguá and at the Michigan summer race, and finished fourth at the U.S. 500. The driver ranked fourth in points. In 1997 he scored a third place finish at Toronto and a fourth place at Laguna Seca. For the 1998 season Ribeiro remained in CART but moved to Team Penske, where he scored just 13 points with no top 5s. He retired at the end of the 1998 season.

The Brazilian received an offer to work with Roger Penske in South America, with United Auto, running over 15 car dealerships in São Paulo. He also promoted the Brazilian Formula Renault and Renault Clio Cup together with Pedro Paulo Diniz.

Ribeiro died on 22 May 2021, aged 55, from colorectal cancer.

Racing record

American open–wheel racing results 
(key) (Races in bold indicate pole position) (Races in italics indicate fastest lap)

Indy Lights

CART

References

External links

 Official site 

1966 births
2021 deaths
Brazilian Champ Car drivers
Indianapolis 500 drivers
Indy Lights drivers
Brazilian racing drivers
EFDA Nations Cup drivers
Racing drivers from São Paulo
Deaths from colorectal cancer
Team Penske drivers
Tasman Motorsports drivers
Paul Stewart Racing drivers
Fortec Motorsport drivers
British Formula Three Championship drivers